The following is a list of earthquakes in Illinois.

Earthquakes

See also
 1811–12 New Madrid earthquakes
 Geology of Illinois
 New Madrid Seismic Zone
 Sandwich Fault Zone
 Wabash Valley Seismic Zone

Notes

References

External links

 Illinois Earthquakes – Western Illinois University
 Earthquakes in Illinois: 1795–2015 – Illinois State Geological Survey
 Information by Region-Illinois – United States Geological Survey

 
Illinois-related lists
Illinois